'Los Galos (English: The Gauls) were a Chilean pop music band that became widely known in Latin America in the 1970s with their romantic electrified ballads.

 History 
Los Galos was formed by former members of a student band, Los Douglas, formed in 1963. Their distinctive sound, derived from a fusion of the American, British and Latin American pop music of their time, first acquired nationwide notoriety in Chile and Argentina with the release of their album and their first hit: “Como deseo ser tu amor” in 1970. A string of hit recordings followed including, ¿Qué esperas de mí?, Un Minuto De Tu Amor, and Perdona Si Me Ves Llorar which established them alongside Los Ángeles Negros as one of the most popular music groups of the 1970s - in Chile, Argentina, and other Latin American countries. Their first lead vocalist, Lucho Muñoz, left the band in 1974 and was replaced by Humberto Salse (Vadim).

Early in their career, group members were involved in a serious road accident while on tour, which leads to some member leaving the band and rumours that members of the group had died.

 Members 
Leo Núñez – Musical Director / Trumpet
Jorge Deij Molina - Keyboards
Roberto Zúñiga – Group Director / Drums
Eladio Farías - Bass
Juan Suazo – Guitar
Nicolás Parra - Saxophone
Carlos Peña – Vocals

 Discography 
 Albums Tu nombre al viento (1969)Como deseo ser tu amor (1970)El sonido de los galos (1971)Historia de un amor (1972)No quiero estar esta noche sin ti (1972)Entrega total (1973)Te extraño tanto amor (1974)La Magia Terminó (1974)De Boca en Boca (1976)Te quiero cada día más'' (1979)

References

External links
 losgalos.com ( in Spanish )

Chilean pop music groups
Rock en Español music groups